Mantoididae is a family of praying mantises which contains Neotropical species of praying mantises from tropical North and South America. The family was formerly represented by the sole genus Mantoida, until the genus Paramantoida was described in 2014 and Vespamantoida in 2019. The family differs from the closely related Chaeteessidae in having an apical claw on the fore tibiae which are also less curved. Males have ocelli and a cylindrical body shape, unlike the dorsoventrally flattened Chaeteessidae. The cerci are also shorter.

Genera 
The following genera are placed in the family Mantoididae:
Mantoida - 11 species,
Paramantoida  - 1 species Paramantoida amazonica, typically dark colored with white spots resembling certain wasps
Vespamantoida - 2 species, resemble some ichneumonid wasps
†Pseudomantoida Schubnel and Nel 2019 Oise amber, France, Eocene (Ypresian)

References 

 
Mantodea families
Mantodea of North America
Mantodea of South America
Taxa named by Ermanno Giglio-Tos